John Willard Dorn (born December 28, 1943) is an American politician in the state of Minnesota. He served in the Minnesota House of Representatives.

References

1943 births
Living people
Democratic Party members of the Minnesota House of Representatives
Politicians from Mankato, Minnesota